Canavalia napaliensis, commonly known as the Mākaha Valley Jack-bean, is a species of flowering plant in the pea family, Fabaceae, that is endemic to Hawaii. It was previously more widespread in the archipelago and could be found in Oahu's Mākaha Valley, but is today restricted to northwestern Kauai. This and other Hawaiian Canavalia are known there as ʻāwikiwiki.

Its natural habitats are tropical dry forests, lowland moist forests, dry shrublands, and moist shrublands. It is threatened by habitat destruction, mainly due to introduced grazing mammals. There are no more than 206 individual plants left in five populations along the Nā Pali Coast. This plant was listed endangered along with 47 other Kauai species in 2010.

References

External links

USDA Plants Profile for Canavalia napaliensis

napaliensis
Endemic flora of Hawaii
Biota of Lanai
Plants described in 1970
Taxonomy articles created by Polbot